Ibba County is one of 10 county administrative area in Western Equatoria State, South Sudan.

References

Western Equatoria
Counties of South Sudan